Vladimir Georgievich Epifantsev (born 8 September 1971, Moscow, USSR) is a Russian theatre and cinema actor, filmmaker, television presenter and music video director.

Biography 
Epifantsev graduated from the acting faculty of the Boris Shchukin Theatre Institute (1994, course of Vladimir Ivanov), studied at GITIS in the directing Department. Then he created a theatrical project Good theatre. In 1997-1998 he created and led the production of the television program the Sandman on the channel of TV-6. Later, he participated in the Cultivator and Muzoboz.

In 1998-1999, he starred in the infamous movie The Green Elephant, which was his first experience in cinema. Subsequently, he has twice played in the movies by directed by Svetlana Baskova, Five Bottles of Vodka (2001) and For Marx... (2012).

In 2007, he participated in the TV show King of the Ring under the moniker Stream of Blood (the title of one of his theatrical performances) against Alexey Chumakov.

In 2009, he appeared in Dancing with the Stars: The 2009 Season on the channel Russia-1 in a pair with Anastasia Novozhilova.

In 2012, he starred in the TV crime drama, Kremen ("Flint"), in which he acts as Andrey Shamanov, a GRU major who attempts to fight terrorists.

In 2012, along with his wife Anastasiya Vedenskaya, Epifantsev took part in the TV show Polyglot on the channel Culture.

In 2016, he starred in the video The Smell of Men by group 2rbina 2rista.

On 5 January 2017, he announced the continuation of the film Green Elephant called Operation ZS.

Selected filmography
1999 — The Green Elephant
2002 — Five Bottles of Vodka
2008 — Man of East
2011 — Generation P
2011 — Home
2012 — Spy
2016 — Dance to Death
2016 — 8 Best Dates
2021 — Captain Volkonogov Escaped
2022 — Bodybuilder

References

External links
 
 ПРОК-Театр

1971 births
Living people
Russian male actors
Russian film directors
Male actors from Moscow
Russian male voice actors
Russian television presenters
Russian music video directors
Russian theatre directors